Lookout Mountain at  above sea level is a peak in the White Cloud Mountains of Idaho. The peak is located in Sawtooth National Recreation Area in Custer County  from Blackmon Peak, its line parent. A maintained trail goes to the summit where an old U.S. Forest Service fire lookout is located. The lookout was built by the Civilian Conservation Corps and was recently refurbished.

References 

Mountains of Custer County, Idaho
Mountains of Idaho
Sawtooth National Forest